The 1993 UMass Minutemen football team represented the University of Massachusetts Amherst in the 1993 NCAA Division I-AA football season as a member of the Atlantic 10 Conference. The team was coached by Mike Hodges and played its home games at Warren McGuirk Alumni Stadium in Hadley, Massachusetts. The 1993 season was notable due to a mid-season overseas matchup with rival Rhode Island. The two New England teams faced off in the Wild Geese Classic held in Limerick, Ireland, with UMass winning the game by a score of 36–14. UMass finished the season with a record of 8–3 overall and 5–3 in conference play.

Schedule

References

UMass
UMass Minutemen football seasons
UMass Minutemen football